Dabbāba refer to:

 Dabbaba (chess), a fairy chess piece
 Modern Arabic for tank
 Older Arabic for a type of medieval siege engine designed to shelter men who are digging a hole in enemy fortifications